In geometry, if X is a manifold with an action of a topological group G by analytical diffeomorphisms, the notion of a (G, X)-structure on a topological space is a way to formalise it being locally isomorphic to X with its G-invariant structure; spaces with a (G, X)-structure are always manifolds and are called (G, X)-manifolds. This notion is often used with G being a Lie group and X a homogeneous space for G. Foundational examples are hyperbolic manifolds and affine manifolds.

Definition and examples

Formal definition 

if  and there is a nonempty open subset  such that  are equal when restricted to  then 

(this definition is inspired by the analytic continuation property of analytic diffeomorphisms on an analytic manifold).

This means that there exists:

open embeddings  called charts;

Riemannian examples 

Then a  manifold is simply a flat manifold.

A particularly interesting example is when  is a Riemannian symmetric space, for example hyperbolic space.

Pseudo-Riemannian examples 

When  is Minkowski space and  the Lorentz group the notion of a -structure is the same as that of a flat Lorentzian manifold.

Other examples 

When  is the affine space and  the group of affine transformations then one gets the notion of an affine manifold.

When  is the n-dimensional real projective space and  one gets the notion of a projective structure.

Developing map and completeness

Developing map 

Let  be a -manifold which is connected (as a topological space).

We may use analytic continuation along  to extend  so that its domain includes .

Monodromy 

Given a developing map , the monodromy or holonomy of a -structure is the unique morphism  which satisfies

.

Complete (G,X)-structures 

A  structure is said to be complete if it has a developing map which is also a covering map (this does not depend on the choice of developing map since they differ by a diffeomorphism). For example, if  is simply connected the structure is complete if and only if the developing map is a diffeomorphism.

Examples

Riemannian (G,X)-structures 

If  is a Riemannian manifold and  its full group of isometry, then a -structure is complete if and only if the underlying Riemannian manifold is geodesically complete (equivalently metrically complete). In particular, in this case if the underlying space of a -manifold is compact then the latter is automatically complete.

In the case where  is the hyperbolic plane the developing map is the same map as given by the Uniformisation Theorem.

Other cases 

In general compactness of the space does not imply completeness of a -structure. For example, an affine structure on the torus is complete if and only if the monodromy map has its image inside the translations. But there are many affine tori which do not satisfy this condition, for example any quadrilateral with its opposite sides glued by an affine map yields an affine structure on the torus, which is complete if and only if the quadrilateral is a parallelogram.

Interesting examples of complete, noncompact affine manifolds are given by the Margulis spacetimes.

(G,X)-structures as connections 

Notes

References 

Differential geometry
Structures on manifolds